ULAE may refer to:
 L-ribulose-5-phosphate 3-epimerase, an enzyme
 Mezen Airport, Mezen, Mezensky District, Arkhangelsk Oblast, Russia (ICAO code)